Erik Forssell (born January 30, 1982) is a Swedish former professional ice hockey player who last played for Skellefteå AIK and the Malmö Redhawks in the Swedish Hockey League (SHL).

References

External links

1982 births
IF Björklöven players
Living people
Malmö Redhawks players
People from Skellefteå Municipality
Skellefteå AIK players
Swedish ice hockey centres
Sportspeople from Västerbotten County